Kondumal is a census town in Chandrapur district in the Indian state of Maharashtra.

Demographics
 India census, Kondumal had a population of 11,722. Males constitute 52% of the population and females 48%. Kondumal has an average literacy rate of 84%, higher than the national average of 59.5%: male literacy is 86%, and female literacy is 82%. In Kondumal, 13% of the population is under 6 years of age.

References

Cities and towns in Chandrapur district